Jackson LaCombe (born January 9, 2001) is an American college ice hockey player for the University of Minnesota of the Big Ten Conference.

Playing career

Amateur
LaCombe attended Shattuck-Saint Mary's where he helped SSM win the 2016 USA Hockey Youth Tier I 14 U national championship. During his senior year in the 2018–19 season he set a school record for points by a defenseman with 89 points during the 2018–19 season.

Collegiate
LaCombe began his collegiate career for the Minnesota Golden Gophers during the 2019–20 season. During his freshman year he recorded three goals and ten assists in 37 games and led all Big Ten freshman defenseman with 61 blocked shots and ranked second in scoring. He was subsequently named to the Big Ten All-Freshman Team.

During the 2020–21 season, in his sophomore year, he recorded four goals and 17 assists in 27 games. Following an outstanding season, he was named to the All-Big Ten First Team and named an AHCA Second Team All-American.

International play

LaCombe represented the United States at the 2021 World Junior Ice Hockey Championships, where he recorded one assist in six games and won a gold medal.

Career statistics

Regular season and playoffs

International

Awards and honors

References

External links
 

2001 births
Living people
Anaheim Ducks draft picks
Chicago Steel players
American ice hockey defensemen
Minnesota Golden Gophers men's ice hockey players
People from Eden Prairie, Minnesota
Ice hockey players from Minnesota
AHCA Division I men's ice hockey All-Americans